Han Yoo-mi (Hangul: 한유미, Hanja: 韓有美; born 5 February 1982) is a South Korean volleyball player. She was part of the silver medal winning team at the 2010 Asian Games.  She was also part of the South Korean team that came fourth at the 2012 Summer Olympics.  She was part of the South Korea women's national volleyball team at the 2010 FIVB Volleyball Women's World Championship in Japan. She played with Korea Volleyball Association.

Awards and nominations

References

1982 births
Living people
South Korean women's volleyball players
Asian Games medalists in volleyball
Volleyball players at the 2006 Asian Games
Volleyball players at the 2010 Asian Games
Volleyball players at the 2012 Summer Olympics
Olympic volleyball players of South Korea
Medalists at the 2010 Asian Games
Asian Games silver medalists for South Korea